Mandawar is a town and a nagar panchayat city in Bijnor district in the Indian state of Uttar Pradesh. It is a green area near the holy river Ganges. Most residents are farmers. It is known for its roses.

Demographics
 India census, Mandawar had a population of 21,078 of which 11,119 are males and 9,959 are females. Mandawar has an average literacy rate of 61.22%, lower than the state average of 67.68%: male literacy is 65.62%, and female literacy is 56.38%. Children age 0-6 make up 3,020, 14.33 % of the total. The Female Sex Ratio is of 896 against state average of 912. The Child Sex Ratio is around 826 compared to the Uttar Pradesh state average of 902.

Governance 
Mandawar Nagar Panchayat hosts over 3,486 houses. It is authorized to build roads in the panchayat and impose taxes on properties in its jurisdiction.

Education

St.Paul's High School was established in 1992 by the Education Society of the Catholic Diocese of Bijnor. It is a leading educational institution of the town. A Hindi medium high school, enrolling 1500 students from the town and nearby villages.

Mahatama Gandhi Inter College is the largest and oldest inter college. It was established around 1957 by Pandit Keshav Sharan Sharma. Most of the children of the villages around Mandawar enroll there.

Adarsh Vidya Niketan Shahabazpur was established around 1980. Located in Kelawala (the four-way intersection where the roads to the villages Shahabazpur and Mohandiya meet), 1 km from Mandawar, it became an inter college about 2003 through the work of Surendra Vishnoi and Mahashay Natthu Singh, who was the founding principal and manager. A number of students study there instead of Mahatama Gandhi Inter College.

Adarsh Vidya Niketan (junior) school is located in Kelawala (Sahabazpur) along with the senior school which is managed by Sanjeev Kumar.

Shining Star Public High School was established in 1987. Modern Era Public School is located in Chandok Mandawar road. Prema Satyaveera Girls Inter College is available for girls only. 

The nearest degree college, Mandawar Degree College sits on Mandawar Chandok road. 

Many schools offer primary education.

References

Cities and towns in Bijnor district